Holy Innocents Church or Church of the Holy Innocents may refer to:

In Australia
 Church of the Holy Innocents, Rossmore, Sydney, New South Wales

In the United Kingdom
 Holy Innocents Church, Lamarsh, Essex, England
 Holy Innocents Church, South Norwood, London, England
 Holy Innocents Church, Southwater, Sussex, England

In the United States
 Holy Innocents Church (Chicago, Illinois)
 Holy Innocents Catholic Church (Roseville, Michigan)
 Holy Innocents' Episcopal Church (Como, Mississippi)
 Church of the Holy Innocents (Hoboken, New Jersey)
 Church of the Holy Innocents (Albany, New York)
 Church of the Holy Innocents (Brooklyn, New York)
 Church of the Holy Innocents (Manhattan, New York)
 Church of the Holy Innocents (Highland Falls, New York)